Rima Wakarua (born 25 March 1976 in Auckland, New Zealand) is an Italian former rugby union footballer and coach. He played for Rugby Club I Cavalieri Prato having previously played for Gran Parma Rugby, at fly-half.

Biography
Wakarua is a naturalized Italian, having moved there in 1999, and is born of a New Zealand father and Scottish mother. He was brought into the Italy 2003 Rugby World Cup squad having only played in the second tier of the Italian league and had not even been involved in squad get-togethers. His performance with the boot saw Italy overcome Canada in Canberra. He has 11 caps and has scored 99 points for Italy.

References

External links
6 Nations profile

1976 births
Italian rugby union players
New Zealand rugby union players
Italian people of New Zealand descent
New Zealand people of Scottish descent
Rugby union players from Auckland
Living people
Italy international rugby union players
New Zealand Māori sportspeople
Cavalieri Prato players
Rugby union fly-halves